Henry Alan Walter Richard Percy, 11th Duke of Northumberland  (1 July 1953 – 31 October 1995), styled Earl Percy until 1988, was a British peer. He was the eldest son of Hugh Percy, 10th Duke of Northumberland, and a godchild of Queen Elizabeth II. He was educated at Eton College and Christ Church, Oxford. After succeeding to the dukedom on the death of his father, 11 October 1988, he was noted for planting many trees at Syon House, the Ducal residence at Brentford; for an unsuccessful foray into film-making involving the Duke in front of and behind the camera; for romantic relationships with Naomi Campbell's mother Valerie and with American actress Barbara Carrera; and for excessive and adventurous drug taking.

Percy was diagnosed with chronic fatigue syndrome.
He never married and died aged 42 from heart failure after an overdose of amphetamines.

He was succeeded to the Dukedom by his younger brother Lord Ralph Percy.

References

External links

 

1953 births
1995 deaths
311
People educated at Eton College
Alumni of Christ Church, Oxford
Fellows of the Royal Society
Henry Percy, 11th Duke of Northumberland
People with chronic fatigue syndrome
Royalty and nobility with disabilities
British landowners